One Nine Elms is a mixed-use skyscraper scheme currently under construction in Nine Elms, London. It was originally developed by Wanda One, a UK subsidiary company of Dalian Wanda, until they sold the project to R&F Properties, another Chinese firm in 2018. It has been designed by architects Kohn Pedersen Fox (KPF). The development will replace two towers on the site built in the 1970s called Market Towers and forms part of a wider redevelopment of the Nine Elms area of London. The development will include 494 residential apartments and a Park Hyatt luxury hotel. Upon completion, anticipated to be in 2022, One Nine Elms will become one of the tallest residential developments in London and the United Kingdom.

History

Original proposal 

In 2008, property developer Green Property bought the One Nine Elms Lane site, which lies in Nine Elms just south of the River Thames within the London borough of Wandsworth, from Allied Irish Bank.

On 18 June 2012, Wandsworth Council granted planning permission to Green Property along with project managers CIT Group for a mixed-use scheme consisting of residential apartments, offices and shops to replace two 1970s buildings on the site known as the Market Towers. The approved proposals included two skyscrapers of 200 m (656 ft) and 161 m (528 ft).

Sale and design development 

In June 2013, Green Property sold the One Nine Elms site to Chinese developer Dalian Wanda. The scheme, which is Dalian Wanda's first development outside of China, will be overseen by Wanda One - a UK subsidiary of Dalian Wanda.

In April 2014, Wandsworth Council approved revisions for the scheme subject to support from the then London Mayor Boris Johnson. In May 2014, Johnson gave permission for the revised proposals to go ahead despite criticism of the removal of office space from the scheme in order to accommodate a larger hotel which will be Dalian Wanda's first luxury hotel outside of China. A total of 436 residential apartments will also be built. Additionally, the design for One Nine Elms was revised which included the scrapping of a skybridge linking the two towers.

In July 2016, Wanda One arranged financing for the development. As part of the scheme, Dalian Wanda are required to pay £20m to contribute to the London Underground extension of the Northern line and for affordable housing which will be built in another location.

Wider regeneration 

The construction of One Nine Elms is part of a wider redevelopment of the Nine Elms area of London which will include 16,000 new homes as well as the relocation of the U.S. Embassy in London from Grosvenor Square, Mayfair.

Construction 

Demolition of the Market Towers began in May 2014 by McGee Group and was completed in April 2015. Foundation works are taking place following demolition.

In April 2015, it was announced that the developer had awarded the main contract for One Nine Elms to China's largest construction group China State Construction Engineering Corporation (CSCEC) as well as Interserve in a joint venture known as CI-ONE. However, that deal collapsed in April 2016, with Balfour Beatty becoming the new contractor, signing a pre-construction agreement with Wanda One in July 2016. However, that contract came to an end in November 2016 after the two companies failed to agree terms for a new main build contract. In January 2017, Multiplex was announced as the new main contractor for the development.

In January 2018, Wanda sold their interest in the project to R&F Properties, another Chinese firm, for £59 million.

In November 2020, it was announced that the complex's luxury hotel, originally to be branded as a Wanda Vista Hotel, would instead be branded as a Park Hyatt.

Construction of One Nine Elms was expected to be completed in 2022. Progress slowed by February 2022 as R&F Properties was reported to have stopped paying the main contractor Multiplex.

Location 
The building is located on 1 Nine Elms Lane, in the London borough of Wandsworth. The nearest station is Vauxhall.

See also 
List of tallest buildings and structures in London
List of tallest buildings in the United Kingdom

References

External links 
R&F One Nine Elms official website rfnineelms.co.uk
Nine Elms development website nineelmslondon.com

Kohn Pedersen Fox buildings
Proposed skyscrapers in London
Skyscrapers in the London Borough of Wandsworth
Nine Elms